Chinese house may refer to:

Chinese House (Potsdam), a landmark in Germany
Siheyuan, a traditional type of Chinese residence
 China House, formally the Office of China Coordination, a U.S. State Department foreign policy initiative.